Uniemyśl  (formerly German Wilhelmsdorf) is a village in the administrative district of Gmina Police, within Police County, West Pomeranian Voivodeship, in north-western Poland, close to the German border.

History 
First references to Uniemyśl (Wilhelmsdorf) came from 1760. For the history of the region, see History of Pomerania.

Uniemyśl, known as Wilhelmsdorf to its residents while part of Germany, became part of Poland after the end of World War II and changed its name to the Polish Uniemyśl.

Below is a timeline showing the history of the different administrations that this city has been included in.

Political-administrative membership
  1815–1866: German Confederation, Kingdom of Prussia, Pomerania
 1866–1871: North German Confederation, Kingdom of Prussia, Pomerania
  1871–1918: German Empire, Kingdom of Prussia, Pomerania
  1919–1933: Weimarer Republik, Free State of Prussia, Pomerania
  1933–1945: Nazi Germany, Pomerania
  1945–1946: Enclave Police, (the area reporting to the Red Army)
  1946–1952: People's Republic of Poland, Szczecin Voivodeship
  1952–1975: People's Republic of Poland, Szczecin Voivodeship
  1975–1989: People's Republic of Poland, Szczecin Voivodeship
  1989–1998: Poland, Szczecin Voivodeship
  1999 – Current: Poland, Western Pomerania, powiat Police County, Gmina Police

Monuments
 Houses from years 30. and 40. the 20th century
 Railway station from years 30. the 20th century

Demography
 The village has a population:
 1862 – 162
 1939 – 501
 1972 – 400
 2001 – 315

Tourism 
 PTTK path (green footpath  Trail of Ornithologists-Szlak Ornitologów) in an area of Uniemyśl in Wkrzanska Forest.
 Bicycle trail (red  Trail "Puszcza Wkrzańska"-Szlak "Puszcza Wkrzańska")  in an area of Uniemyśl in Wkrzanska Forest.

References

See also 

 Police
 Szczecin

Villages in Police County